Xinpu Minsheng station is a station on the Taipei Metro's Circular line. The station was opened on 31 January 2020. It is located in Banqiao District, New Taipei, Taiwan.

An out-of-station transfer to the Bannan line is available through Xinpu metro station. The two stations are roughly 250 m apart.

Station layout

Exits
Single Exit: Section 3, Minsheng Rd.

Around the station
 Banqiao Siwei Park (300m southwest of the station)
 Chihlee University of Technology (700m south of the station)
 Zhaoyang Vegetable Market (朝陽菜市場) (800m northwest of the station)
 Yumin Night Market (裕民夜市) (850m northwest of the station)
 Banqiao Civil Sports Center (1.3km southwest of the station)
 Xinhai Man-made Wetlands (新海第一期人工濕地) (1.5km northwest of the station)
 Rose Park (1.5km west of the station)
 Banqiao 435 Art Zone (1.9km west of the station)

References

2020 establishments in Taiwan
Circular line stations (Taipei Metro)
Railway stations opened in 2020